William Holwell (1726 – 13 February 1798) was an English cleric and writer.

Life
The eldest son of William Holwell, esq., of Exeter, and Ann Blackall, daughter of Ofspring Blackall, he was born in 1726. He matriculated at Christ Church, Oxford, in December 1741, and graduated B.A. in 1745, M.A. in 1748, and B.D. in 1760.

Holwell was tutor to Lord Beauchamp (the future Francis Ingram-Seymour-Conway, 2nd Marquess of Hertford), and was elected proctor for 1758. He was presented to the vicarage of Thornbury, Gloucestershire by Christ Church in January 1762, was appointed prebendary of Exeter Cathedral in 1776, and was at one time chaplain to George III. He died 13 February 1798.

Works
Holwell wrote:

 Selecti Dionysii Halicarnensis de priscis scriptoribus Tractatus græcè et latinè, 1766.
 The Beauties of Homer, selected from the Iliad, 1775.
 Extracts from Mr. Pope's translation, corresponding with the Beauties of Homer, 1776.
 A Mythological, Etymological, and Historical Dictionary, extracted from the Analysis of Ancient Mythology (with Jacob Bryant), 1793.

References

Attribution
 The entry lists:
 Gent. Mag. 1798, lxviii. 259
 Exeter Cathedral Register
 Oxford Catalogue of Graduates, and Honours Register; 
 Horace Walpole Letters, vi. 107; 
 Thomas Duffus Hardy (editor), John Le Neve, Fasti Ecclesiae Anglicanae
 Gloucester Dioc. Reg.
 Watt, Bibliotheca Britannica; Or, A General Index to British and Foreign Literature
 Nichols Lit. Anecd. iii. 743, confuses this William Holwell with a nephew, William Holwell Carr
 Gilbert, D. (1838) The Parochial History of Cornwall: Founded on the Manuscript Histories of Mr. Hals and Mr. Tonkin; with Additions and Various Appendices, vol. III, p. 171, London:J. B. Nicholls and Son

1726 births
1798 deaths
Alumni of Christ Church, Oxford